A law firm is a business entity formed by one or more lawyers to engage in the practice of law. The primary service rendered by a law firm is to advise clients (individuals or corporations) about their legal rights and responsibilities, and to represent clients in civil or criminal cases, business transactions, and other matters in which legal advice and other assistance are sought.

Arrangements 
Law firms are organized in a variety of ways, depending on the jurisdiction in which the firm practices. Common arrangements include:
 Sole proprietorship, in which the attorney is the law firm and is responsible for all profit, loss and liability;
 General partnership, in which all the attorneys who are members of the firm share ownership, profits and liabilities;
 Professional corporations, which issue stock to the attorneys in a fashion similar to that of a business corporation;
 Limited liability company, in which the attorney-owners are called "members" but are not directly liable to third party creditors of the law firm (prohibited as against public policy in many jurisdictions but allowed in others in the form of a "Professional Limited Liability Company" or "PLLC");
 Professional association, which operates similarly to a professional corporation or a limited liability company;
 Limited liability partnership (LLP), in which the attorney-owners are partners with one another, but no partner is liable to any creditor of the law firm nor is any partner liable for any negligence on the part of any other partner. The LLP is taxed as a partnership while enjoying the liability protection of a corporation.

Restrictions on ownership interests 
In many countries, including the United States, there is a rule that only lawyers may have an ownership interest in, or be managers of, a law firm. Thus, law firms cannot quickly raise capital through initial public offerings on the stock market, like most corporations.  They must either raise capital through additional capital contributions from existing or additional equity partners, or must take on debt, usually in the form of a line of credit secured by their accounts receivable.

In the United States this complete bar to nonlawyer ownership has been codified by the American Bar Association as paragraph (d) of Rule 5.4 of the Model Rules of Professional Conduct and has been adopted in one form or another in all U.S. jurisdictions, except the District of Columbia. However, D.C.'s rule is narrowly tailored to allow equity ownership only by those nonlawyer partners who actively assist the firm's lawyers in providing legal services, and does not allow for the sale of ownership shares to mere passive nonlawyer investors.  The U.K. had a similar rule barring nonlawyer ownership, but under reforms implemented by the Legal Services Act of 2007 law firms have been able to take on a limited number of non-lawyer partners and lawyers have been allowed to enter into a wide variety of business relationships with non-lawyers and non-lawyer owned businesses.  This has allowed, for example, grocery stores, banks and community organizations to hire lawyers to provide in-store and online basic legal services to customers.

The rule is controversial. It is justified by many in the legal profession, notably the American Bar Association which rejected a proposal to change the rule in its Ethics 20/20 reforms,  as necessary to prevent conflicts of interest. In the adversarial system of justice, a lawyer has a duty to be a zealous and loyal advocate on behalf of the client, and also has a duty to not bill the client excessively. Also, as an officer of the court, a lawyer has a duty to be honest and to not file frivolous cases or raise frivolous defenses. Many in the legal profession believe that a lawyer working as a shareholder-employee of a publicly traded law firm might be tempted to evaluate decisions in terms of their effect on the stock price and the shareholders, which would directly conflict with the lawyer's duties to the client and to the courts. Critics of the rule, however, believe that it is an inappropriate way of protecting clients' interests and that it severely limits the potential for the innovation of less costly and higher quality legal services that could benefit both ordinary consumers and businesses.

Multinational law firms
Law firms operating in multiple countries often have complex structures involving multiple partnerships, particularly in jurisdictions such as Hong Kong and Japan which restrict partnerships between local and foreign lawyers. One structure largely unique to large multinational law firms is the Swiss Verein, pioneered by Baker McKenzie in 2004 or as GRATA International, in which multiple national or regional partnerships form an association in which they share branding, administrative functions and various operating costs, but maintain separate revenue pools and often separate partner compensation structures. Other multinational law firms operate as single worldwide partnerships, such as British or American limited liability partnerships, in which partners also participate in local operating entities in various countries as required by local regulations.

Financial indicators 
Three financial statistics are typically used to measure and rank law firms' performance:
 Profits per equity partner (PPEP or PPP): Net operating income divided by number of equity partners. High PPP is often correlated with prestige of a firm and its attractiveness to potential equity partners. However, the indicator is prone to manipulation by re-classifying less profitable partners as non-equity partners.
 Revenue per lawyer (RPL): Gross revenue divided by number of lawyers. This statistic shows the revenue-generating ability of the firm's lawyers in general, but does not factor in the firm's expenses such as associate compensation and office overhead.
 Average compensation of partners (ACP): Total amount paid to equity and nonequity partners (i.e., net operating income plus nonequity partner compensation) divided by the total number of equity and nonequity partners. This results in a more inclusive statistic than PPP, but remains prone to manipulation by changing expense policies and re-classifying less profitable partners as associates.

Structure and promotion

Partnership
Law firms are typically organized around partners, who are joint owners and business directors of the legal operation; associates, who are employees of the firm with the prospect of becoming partners; and a variety of staff employees, providing paralegal, clerical, and other support services. An associate may have to wait as long as 11 years before the decision is made as to whether the associate is made a partner. Many law firms have an "up or out policy", integral to the Cravath System, which had been pioneered during the early 20th century by partner Paul Cravath of Cravath, Swaine & Moore, and became widely adopted by, particularly, white-shoe firms; associates who do not make partner are required to resign, and may join another firm, become a solo practitioner, work in-house for a corporate legal department, or change professions. Burnout rates are notably high in the profession.

Making partner is very prestigious at large or mid-sized firms, due to the competition that naturally results from higher associate-to-partner ratios. Such firms may take out advertisements in professional publications to announce who has made partner. Traditionally, partners shared directly in the profits of the firm, after paying salaried employees, the landlord, and the usual costs of furniture, office supplies, and books for the law library (or a database subscription). Partners in a limited liability partnership can largely operate autonomously with regard to cultivating new business and servicing existing clients within their book of business.

Partner compensation methods vary greatly among law firms. At major United States law firms, the "compensation spread" (ratio between the highest partner salary and lowest partner salary) among firms disclosing information ranges from 3:1 to 24:1. Higher spreads are intended to promote individual performance, while lower spreads are intended to promote teamwork and collegiality.

Many large law firms have moved to a two-tiered partnership model, with equity and non-equity partners. Equity partners are considered to have ownership stakes in the firm, and share in the profits (and losses) of the firm. Non-equity partners are generally paid a fixed salary (albeit much higher than associates), and they are often granted certain limited voting rights with respect to firm operations.

The oldest continuing partnership in the United States is that of Cadwalader, Wickersham & Taft, founded in 1792, in New York City. The oldest law firm in continuous practice in the United States is Rawle & Henderson, founded in 1783, in Philadelphia.

Termination of one's partnership 
It is rare for a partner to be forced out by fellow partners, although that can happen if the partner commits a crime or malpractice, experiences disruptive mental illness, or is not contributing to the firm's overall profitability. However, some large firms have written into their partnership agreement a forced retirement age for partners, which can be anywhere from age 65 on up. In contrast, most corporate executives are at much higher risk of being fired, even when the underlying cause is not directly their fault, such as a drop in the company's stock price. Worldwide, partner retirement ages can be difficult to estimate and often vary widely, particularly because in many countries it is illegal to mandate a retirement age.

"Of counsel" role
In the United States, Canada and Japan, many large and midsize firms have attorneys with the job title of "counsel", "special counsel" or "of counsel." As the Supreme Court of California has noted, the title has acquired several related but distinct definitions which do not easily fit into the traditional partner-associate structure.  These attorneys are people who work for the firm, like associates, although some firms have an independent contractor relationship with their counsel. But unlike associates, and more like partners, they generally have their own clients, manage their own cases, and supervise associates. These relationships are structured to allow more senior attorneys to share in the resources and "brand name" of the firm without being a part of management or profit sharing decisions.  The title is often seen among former associates who do not make partner, or who are laterally recruited to other firms, or who work as in-house counsel and then return to the big firm environment. At some firms, the title "of counsel" is given to retired partners who maintain ties to the firm. Sometimes "of counsel" refers to senior or experienced attorneys, such as foreign legal consultants, with specialized experience in particular aspects of law and practice. They are hired as independent contractors by large firms as a special arrangement, which may lead to profitable results for the partnership. In certain situations "of counsel" could be considered to be a transitional status in the firm.

Mergers and acquisitions between law firms
Mergers, acquisitions, division and reorganizations occur between law firms as in other businesses.  The specific books of business and specialization of attorneys as well as the professional ethical structures surrounding conflict of interest can lead to firms splitting up to pursue different clients or practices, or merging or recruiting experienced attorneys to acquire new clients or practice areas.  Results often vary between firms experiencing such transitions.  Firms that gain new practice areas or departments through recruiting or mergers that are more complex and demanding (and typically more profitable) may see the focus, organization and resources of the firm shift dramatically towards those new departments.  Conversely, firms may be merged among experienced attorneys as partners for purposes of shared financing and resources, while the different departments and practice areas within the new firm retain a significant degree of autonomy.

Law firm mergers tend to be assortative, in that only law firms operating in similar legal systems are likely to merge. For example, U.S. firms will often merge with English law firms, or law firms from other common law jurisdictions. A notable exception is King & Wood Mallesons, a multinational law firm that is the result of a merger between an Australian law firm and a Chinese law firm.

Though mergers are more common among better economies, slowing down a bit during recessions, big firms sometimes use mergers as a strategy to boost revenue during a recession. Nevertheless, data from Altman Weil indicates that only four firms merged in the first half of 2013, as compared to eight in the same period in 2012, and this was taken by them as indicating a dip in morale regarding the legal economy and the amount of demand.

Size

Law firms can vary widely in size. The smallest law firms are lawyers practicing alone, who form the vast majority of lawyers in nearly all countries.

Smaller firms tend to focus on particular specialties of the law (e.g. patent law, labor law, tax law, criminal defense, personal injury); larger firms may be composed of several specialized practice groups, allowing the firm to diversify its client base and market, and to offer a variety of services to their clients.

Large law firms usually have separate litigation and transactional departments. The transactional department advises clients and handles transactional legal work, such as drafting contracts, handling necessary legal applications and filings, and evaluating and ensuring compliance with relevant law; while the litigation department represents clients in court and handles necessary matters (such as discovery and motions filed with the court) throughout the process of litigation.

Anglo-American development

Boutique law firms 
Lawyers in small cities and towns may still have old-fashioned general practices, but most urban lawyers tend to be highly specialized due to the overwhelming complexity of the law today. Thus, some small firms in the cities specialize in practicing only one kind of law (like employment, antitrust, intellectual property, investment funds, telecommunications or aviation) and are called boutique law firms.

Virtual Law Firms 
A 21st Century development has been the appearance of the virtual law firm, a firm with a virtual business address but no brick & mortar office location open to the public, using modern telecommunications to operate from remote locations and provide its services to international clients, avoiding the costs of maintaining a physical premises with lower overheads than traditional law firms. This lower cost structure allows virtual law firms to bill clients on a contingency basis rather than by billable hours paid in advance by retainer.

Related innovations include alternative legal services provider (ALSP), legal outsourcing and what is sometimes called "NewLaw".

The largest law firms have more than  lawyers. These firms, often colloquially called "megafirms" or "biglaw", generally have offices on several continents, bill US$750 per hour or higher, and have a high ratio of support staff per attorney. Because of the localized and regional nature of firms, the relative size of a firm varies.

NewLaw 

NewLaw was devised as a term in 2013 by consultant Eric Chin. NewLaw has been defined as “any model, process, or tool that represents a significantly different approach to the creation or provision of legal services than what the legal profession traditionally has employed”. For example, NewLaw ALSP models may include secondment firms, law and business advice companies, virtual online legal models, and innovative law firms and companies.

BigLaw firms 

The largest firms like to call themselves "BigLaw" firms because they have departments specializing in all categories of legal work with high billable hour rates, which in the U.S. usually means mergers and acquisitions transactions, banking, and certain types of high-stakes corporate litigation. These firms rarely do plaintiffs' personal injury work. However the largest law firms are not very large compared to other major businesses (or even other professional services firms). In 2008, the largest law firm in the world was the British firm Clifford Chance, which had revenue of over US$2 billion. In 2020, Kirkland & Ellis came out on top with US$4.15 billion in revenue while Hogan Lovells rounded out the list at number ten with US$2.25 billion, with Clifford Chance remains the only British firm among the top 10 Biglaw. This can be compared with $404 billion for the world's largest firm by turnover ExxonMobil and $28 billion for the largest professional services firm Deloitte.

Worldwide 
The largest law firms (known as "BigLaw") in the world are headquartered primarily in the United Kingdom and the United States. However, large firms of more than 1,000 lawyers are also found in Australia (MinterEllison, 1,500 attorneys), China (Dacheng, 2,100 attorneys) and Spain (Garrigues, 2,100 attorneys). The American system of licensing attorneys on a state-by-state basis, the tradition of having a headquarters in a single U.S. state and a close focus on profits per partner (as opposed to sheer scale) has to date limited the size of most American law firms. Thus, whilst the most profitable law firms in the world remain in New York, four of the six largest firms in the world are based in London in the United Kingdom. But the huge size of the United States results in a larger number of large firms overall – a 2003 paper noted that the United States alone had 901 law firms with more than 50 lawyers, while there were only 58 such firms in Canada, 44 in Great Britain, 14 in France, and 9 in Germany. There is an increasing tendency towards globalisation of law firms.

Due to their size, the U.S.- and U.K.-based law firms are the most prestigious and powerful in the world, and they tend to dominate the international market for legal services. A 2007 research paper noted that firms from other countries merely pick up their leftovers: "[M]uch of the competition is relatively orderly whereby predominantly Australian, New Zealand, and Canadian firms compete for business not required by English or American law firms."

Recession 
As a result of the U.S. recession in 2008 and 2009 many U.S. law firms have downsized staff considerably, and some have closed.  The Denver Post reported that major law firms have cut more than 10,000 jobs nationwide in 2009. On February 12, 2009, Bloomberg reported that 700 jobs were cut that one day at law firms across the country. Among the firms closed included Heller Ehrman, a San Francisco-based firm established in 1890 and Halliwells of the UK. Among those that survived, law firm layoffs became so common that trade publications like American Lawyer produced an ongoing “Layoff List” of the law firms nationwide that cut jobs.

Salaries
Law firm salary structures typically depend on firm size. Small-firm salaries vary widely within countries and from one country to the next, and are not often publicly available. Because most countries do not have unified legal professions, there are often significant disparities in income among the various legal professions within a particular country. Finally, the availability of salary data also depends upon the existence of journalists and sociologists able to collect and analyze such data.

United States 
The U.S. is presently the only country with enough lawyers, as well as journalists and sociologists who specialize in studying them, to have widely available data on salary structures at major law firms.

In 2006, median salaries of new graduates ranged from US$50,000 per year in small firms (two to ten attorneys) to US$160,000 per year in very large firms (more than 501 attorneys). The distribution of these salaries was highly bimodal, with the majority of new lawyers earning at either the high end or the low end of the scale, and a median salary of US$62,000. In the summer of 2016, New York law firm Cravath, Swaine & Moore raised its first-year associate salary to $180,000. Many other high-end New York-based and large national law firms soon followed. Two years later, in the summer of 2018, New York law firm Milbank raised its first-year associate salary to $190,000, with other major firms following shortly thereafter. In 2022 Milbank increased first-year compensation to $215,000, with most comparable firms following suit.

The traditional salary model for law firm associates is lockstep compensation, in which associate salaries go up by a fixed amount each year from the associate's law school graduation. However, many firms have switched to a level-based compensation system, in which associates are divided into three (or sometimes four) levels based on skills mastered. In 2013, the median salaries for the three associate levels were $152,500, $185,000 and $216,000 among large firms (more than 700 lawyers), and $122,000, $143,500 and $160,000 among all firms.

Some prominent law firms, like Goodwin Procter and Paul Hastings, give generous signing bonuses (e.g., $20k) to incoming first-year associates who hold JD/MBA degrees.

Another way law firm associates increase their earnings or improve their employment conditions is through a lateral move to another law firm.  
A 2014 survey by LexisNexis indicated that over 95% of law firms consulted intended to hire lateral attorneys within the next two years. Though the success for both the attorney and the law firms in lateral hiring has been questioned. The National Law Review reported that the cost of recruiting, compensating, and integrating a lateral attorney can be upwards of $600,000 and that 60% of lateral attorney hires fail to thrive at their new law firms.

United Kingdom
British firms typically practise lockstep compensation. In London, entry-level solicitor salaries (NQ - Newly Qualified) are typically: (i) £40,000-70,000 at boutique and national firms, (ii) £80,000-100,000 at magic circle firms, and (iii) £120,000-£155,000 at London offices of leading US firms.

A senior associate with six years' experience may make £68,000-120,000 at a national firm or upwards of £160,000 at a global firm. Salary levels are lower in areas outside London.

Australia
Australia has regional variation in lawyer salaries, with the highest salary levels in Sydney, followed by Melbourne, Perth, Brisbane, then Adelaide. Salaries vary between top-tier, mid-size, and small firms. At top-tier firms in Sydney, salaries of lawyers who have been admitted to practice range from $75,000 to $92,000 and partners make on average $1,215,000. In Sydney, mid-tier starting salaries for admitted lawyers range from between $65,000 and $82,000 Most Australian lawyers are not admitted until ten months into their time at their law firm, since the initial period involves supervised legal training before admission is granted.

Typically in Australian firms lawyers are in a lock-step system for the first two years of practice, following which pay increases are dependent on performance assessed, in large measure, by satisfaction of billable hour targets.

Hong Kong
Newly qualified associates at leading firms in Hong Kong typically make HK$840,000 to HK$948,000, with partners in the HK$1.6 million to HK$4 million+ range; many firms pay New York salaries with cost of living adjustments.

Singapore
At local firms in Singapore, associates in their first three years typically make $60,000 to $100,000, while midlevel (4–7 years) associates make $110,000 to $180,000 and senior (8+ years) associates make $160,000 or more. International firms pay significantly more, with senior associates often making more than $250,000.

India
There is more information available for entry level associates. First-year lawyers earn anywhere between INR 8,000 to INR 1,10,000 per month. Tier 1 law firms provide the best pay package, of about INR 15,00,000 annually. There is wide difference in the salary range depends on the city, law firm, and university of the candidate. The salary is higher in cities like Mumbai and Delhi NCR as opposed to other cities like Kolkata, Pune, Ahmedabad, etc.

Location
Most law firms are located in "law office" buildings of various sizes, ranging from modest one-story buildings to some of the tallest skyscrapers in the world (though only in 2004, Paul Hastings was the first firm to put its name on a skyscraper).

In late 2001, it was widely publicized that John C. Dearie's personal injury plaintiffs' firm in the state of New York has been experimenting with bus-sized "mobile law offices." The firm insists that it does not "chase ambulances". It claims that a law office on wheels is more convenient for personal injury plaintiffs, who are often recovering from severe injuries and thus find it difficult to travel far from their homes for an intake interview.

Rankings
Law firms are ranked both objectively, such as by revenue, profits per partner, and subjectively, by various legal publishers and journalists.

As legal practice is adversarial, law firm rankings are widely relied on by prospective associates, lateral hires and legal clients. Subjective rankings typically cover practice areas such as The American Lawyer's Corporate Scorecard and Top IP Firms.  Work place rankings are directed toward lawyers or law students, and cover such topics as quality of life, hours, family friendliness and salaries. Finally, statistical rankings generally cover profit-related data such as profits per partner and revenue per lawyer. Third party attorney ranking services such as Chambers and Partners and Martindale-Hubbell are generally very competitive and can help raise an individual attorney's professional profile, and to catch this marketing advantage, over 1,200 attorney ranking and or awards have sprung up in the U.S.   Various state bar associations have taken notice of the prolific growth of attorney honor awards and have determined that lawyers may refer to such honors in advertising “only when the basis for comparison can be verified” and the organization providing the award “has made adequate inquiry into the fitness of the individual lawyer.” 

In an October 2007 press conference reported in The Wall Street Journal and The New York Times, the law student group Building a Better Legal Profession released its first annual ranking of top law firms by average billable hours, pro bono participation, and demographic diversity.  Most notably, the report ranked the percentages of women, African-Americans, Hispanics, Asian-Americans, and gays & lesbians at America's top law firms. The group has sent the information to top law schools around the country, encouraging students to take this demographic data into account when choosing where to work after graduation.  As more students choose where to work based on the firms' diversity rankings, firms face an increasing market pressure in order to attract top recruits.

In popular culture

A number of television shows, movies and books have revolved around relationships occurring in fictional law firms, highlighting both public fascination with and misperception of the lives of lawyers in high-powered settings.

One popular American legal drama television series is called Suits. There is one popular American dramedy, also known as, comedy drama called Boston Legal which was created by David E. Kelley and produced in association with 20th Century Fox Television for ABC. It is a spin-off of another long running Kelley series, The Practice, following the exploits of former character Alan Shore at the legal firm of Crane, Poole & Schmidt.

One famous legal movie is called The Firm, which was adapted from a book written by John Grisham.

The television series Better Call Saul features several fictional law firms.

See also

 List of largest law firms by revenue
 List of largest law firms by profits per partner
 Book of business (law)
 Law firm network
 Multidisciplinary professional services networks
 White shoe firm

References

External links

 Different types of law firm in the UK

 
Practice of law
Legal entities
Legal organizations
Knowledge firms